is a Japanese YouTuber and competitive eater.

Career
Yuka Kinoshita began posting on her eating-focused YouTube channel since 2014, five years after her debut in Japanese competitive eating competitions.

Kinoshita uploads daily videos in which she eats anywhere between 5,000 to 23,000 calorie meals. Usually Kinoshita edits her videos into 5 to 7 minute vlogs, but occasionally she uploads longer "live eating" videos in the tradition of mukbang. As of June 2020, her videos have garnered more than 2 billion views.

Kinoshita's videos are particularly in Japanese and are accessible to English-speaking viewers because they are accompanied by English subtitles. Partly for this reason, she has attracted attention from English-language news sources. She has also been featured in the Japanese television programme, .

References

External links
 
 
 Yuka Kinoshita's profile  on UUUM

1985 births
Japanese competitive eaters
Living people
Japanese YouTubers